The 2009 A Championship was the second season of the A Championship in Ireland. The season was sponsored by Newstalk. The league featured 18 teams. Shamrock Rovers A were the champions while the runners up, Salthill Devon, were promoted to the First Division.

Overview
18 teams participated in the 2009 A Championship. 12 of these were the reserve teams of League of Ireland clubs. The 2008 champions UCD A and Limerick 37 A did not enter teams for the 2009 season. They were replaced by Sporting Fingal A and 
Dundalk A. The six non-reserve teams included Salthill Devon and Tullamore Town, both of whom played in the 2008 season.  Cobh Ramblers had been relegated from the 2008 Premier Division but were demoted directly to the A Championship after being refused a First Division licence. Castlebar Celtic, F.C. Carlow and Tralee Dynamos were making their debut at senior national level. They were the first clubs from their respective counties of Mayo, Carlow and 
Kerry to play at this level.

The regular season started on 4 April and was completed by early November. The format saw the 18 teams split into two groups of nine, divided roughly into southern and northern  groups. The two groups used a traditional round-robin format. The two group winners, Shamrock Rovers A and Salthill Devon, then played off in a final. Shamrock Rovers emerged as champions. As the highest placed non-reserve team, Salthill Devon also qualified for a promotion/relegation play-off.  However they were subsequently promoted directly to the 2010 First Division after their opponents, Kildare County, withdrew from the League of Ireland before the play-off could be played.

Group 1

Teams

Final table

Results

Group 2

Teams

Final table

Results

Final

See also
 2009 League of Ireland Premier Division
 2009 League of Ireland First Division
 2009 League of Ireland Cup

References

 
3
A Championship seasons
Ireland
Ireland